Prince Antoni Henryk Radziwiłł (13 June 1775 – 7 April 1833) was a Polish and Prussian noble, aristocrat, musician, and politician. Initially an hereditary Duke of Nieśwież and Ołyka, as a scion of the Radziwiłł family he also held the honorific title of a Reichsfürst of the Holy Roman Empire. Between 1815 and 1831 he acted as Duke-Governor of the Grand Duchy of Posen, an autonomous province of the Kingdom of Prussia created out of Greater Polish lands annexed in the Partitions of Poland.

Biography

Antoni Radziwiłł was born on 13 June 1775 in Vilnius to Michał Hieronim Radziwiłł and Helena née Przeździecka. From 1792 he attended Göttingen University and was invited to the court of King Frederick William II of Prussia. In 1796 he married Princess Louise of Prussia, the second daughter of Prince Augustus Ferdinand of Prussia and hence a niece of the late Prussian king Frederick the Great. His new family convinced him that he should be a mediator between the Poles living under the Third Partition after the failed Kościuszko Uprising and the Prussian authorities in Berlin. Fluctuating between Berlin, Warsaw and Saint Petersburg, Radziwiłł developed the idea of making the province of South Prussia the nucleus of a renewed Polish kingdom, ruled by the Prussian king in personal union.

During Napoleon's 1806 campaign in Poland during the War of the Fourth Coalition he tried to incite a Polish uprising against the French army and to convince Prince Józef Poniatowski to abandon his French allies and join the cause of the Russian Empire and Prussia. He failed on both occasions, when Prussia suffered a crushing defeat at the Battle of Jena-Auerstedt. Instead Napoleon's expedition sparked the Greater Poland Uprising, which led to the establishment of the Duchy of Warsaw under the rule of King Frederick Augustus I of Saxony with Prince Poniatowski as war minister. In the following years Radziwiłł retired to his city palace in Berlin and concentrated on regaining his family's vast estates in the Russian partition from the hands of Emperor Alexander I of Russia.

Duke-Governor

Upon the Final Act of the 1815 Congress of Vienna, he was sent to the Greater-Poland capital Poznań as Duke-Governor and representative of Prussian King Frederick William III in the Grand Duchy of Posen. Struggling between his Polish subjects and the Prussian authorities, Radziwiłł found himself with little power, as effective power was executed by Oberpräsident Joseph Zerboni di Sposetti and the district governors heading the Regierungsbezirke of Posen and Bromberg. He unsuccessfully tried to oppose the Germanisation campaign begun by the Prussians.  His daughter Elisa's engagement to Prussian Prince (later German Emperor) William I was broken in 1824.

Shortly after the outbreak of the 1830 November Uprising in Russian Congress Poland led by his brother Michał Gedeon Radziwiłł, he was deprived of all powers, and the rule passed to Oberpräsident Eduard Heinrich von Flottwell. Next year the office of Duke-Governor was abolished, and the autonomy of the Grand Duchy was cancelled. It was incorporated into the Provinces of Prussia, renamed the "Province of Posen" in 1848.

Antoni Henryk Radziwiłł returned to his palace in Berlin, where he died on 7 April 1833. He was buried in the Poznań Cathedral. His children with Louise were Germanized and never returned to Poznań; however, as owners of the Nieborów manor near Warsaw and huge family estates in today's Belarus, they paid frequent visits to other parts of Poland.

Patron of the arts

Antoni Radziwiłł is better known for his art patronage than for his ill-fated political career. His palaces in Berlin (the later Reich Chancellery of Otto von Bismarck), Poznań and Antonin near Ostrów Wielkopolski were known for great concerts performed by one of the most notable musicians of his times. Apart from the guitar, cello and opera concertos performed by Radziwiłł himself, among his guests were Niccolò Paganini (concert in Poznań on 19 May 1829), Johann Wolfgang von Goethe, Frédéric Chopin and Ludwig van Beethoven. Chopin wrote his Introduction and Polonaise Op. 3 for cello and piano especially for Radziwiłł. He also performed a concert in his palace in Poznań on 2 October 1828. Additionally, Chopin dedicated his Piano Trio (Chopin) Op. 8 to Radziwiłł. Ludwig van Beethoven dedicated his Ouverture Op. 115 (Zur Namensfeier) to him, while Goethe participated in his efforts to write the music for his . Maria Agata Szymanowska dedicated to him the Serenade pour le Pianoforte avec le accompagnement de violoncelle. He was also a notable sponsor of Polish theatres and his wife opened the first public school for girls in Poznań in 1830.

Awards 
 : Knight of the Order of the White Eagle, 6 September 1793; 1 December 1815
  Kingdom of Prussia:
 Knight of the Order of the Red Eagle, 1795
 Knight of the Order of the Black Eagle, 16 March 1796
 : Knight of the Order of Saint Hubert, 1825
 : Knight of Honour and Devotion

See also
 Trąby coat of arms
 Radziwiłł

References

Literature
 Witold Jakóbczyk, Przetrwać na Wartą 1815–1914, Dzieje narodu i państwa polskiego, vol. III-55, Krajowa Agencja Wydawnicza, Warszawa 1989

External links 
 Scores by Antoni Radziwiłł in digital library Polona

Lieutenant generals of Prussia
1775 births
1833 deaths
Politicians from Vilnius
Polish composers
Polish Romantic composers
Antoni
People from the Grand Duchy of Posen
Burials at Poznań Cathedral
19th-century classical composers
Polish male classical composers
19th-century male musicians
Knights of Malta
Recipients of the Order of the White Eagle (Poland)